Constantin Romeo Stancu (born  11 May 1978) is a former Romanian footballer.

Honours
Rapid București
 Cupa României: 2005–06, 2006–07
 Supercupa României: 2007

External links
 
 

1978 births
Living people
Sportspeople from Galați
Romanian footballers
Association football midfielders
FC U Craiova 1948 players
AFC Rocar București players
FC Politehnica Timișoara players
ASC Oțelul Galați players
CSM Unirea Alba Iulia players
CS Mioveni players
Liga I players